Alan Kenyon-Hoare was a Continuing Anglican bishop. He was Bishop Ordinary of the Missionary Diocese of Southern Africa in the Anglican Catholic Church since 7 November 2010 until 1 March 2015, when he resigned for health reasons.  He died on 20 January 2021

An Anglican Catholic Church priest, Kenyon-Hoare moved from the United States to South Africa, to work in their Missionary Diocese of Southern Africa. Kenyon-Hoare was the founder and he is the Rector of the Parish of the Holy Paraclete, in Edgemead, Cape Town, South Africa. He was nominated Vicar General, after the death of Innocent Nyoni, in July 2005.

He was consecrated Bishop Ordinary of the Missionary Diocese of Southern Africa on 7 October 2010 and enthroned on 7 November 2010.

In August 2013, in an article published in The Trinitarian, the official organ of his denomination, he declared the Presiding Bishop of the Episcopal Church of the United States to be anathema, having committed the sin of blasphemy against the Holy Spirit.

References

External links
The Very Rev. Alan Kenyon-Hoare Biography

Living people
American Continuing Anglicans
Anglo-Catholic bishops
21st-century Anglican bishops in Africa
Anglo-Catholic missionaries
American Anglo-Catholics
Year of birth missing (living people)
21st-century American clergy